An interim freezing order is a type of court order issued by a British court to freeze access to a person's property while they are under investigation.

See also 
Unexplained wealth order
Asset freezing
Criminal Finances Act 2017

References 

Court orders